Bastard is the debut mixtape by American rapper Tyler, the Creator. It was self-produced by Tyler, the Creator, and was first self-released on December 25, 2009. Due to its free online release and lack of retail availability, Bastard is commonly considered a mixtape, although Tyler himself refers to the project as his debut studio album. The mixtape was published on DatPiff.

Concept and content 
The songs were written and recorded by Tyler from 2007 through 2009, and released on December 25, 2009. Tyler produced most of the album using FL Studio. Bastard features Tyler speaking to a character named Dr. TC, who acts as Tyler's therapist and guidance counselor. The title track contains Dr. TC hinting that Tyler's then-upcoming debut album, called Goblin (2011), will be an additional session with him, stating that there would be three sessions. Both songs "Odd Toddlers" and "Slow It Down" were previously released on The Odd Future Tape (2008). The chopped and screwed version (which was hosted by fellow rapper and label-mate Mike G) was released for free online. On December 25, 2010, one year after the album's initial release, Bastard was re-released with Brandun DeShay's verse on "Session" being replaced with a verse from Mike G, due to a dissension between Tyler and DeShay. The project is now made available on Odd Future's online music store, with DeShay's vocals returning to that same track. Tyler later announced intended plans on re-releasing Bastard in a remastered physical form through Odd Future Records. However, since this announcement, nothing has materialized.

Reception and controversy 

Bastard received critical acclaim, and was ranked at number 32 on Pitchfork's list of the Top 50 Albums of 2010, while the single "French!" was ranked at number 61 on Pitchfork Media's list of the Top 100 Tracks of 2010. The mixtape, alongside Tyler's debut studio album, Goblin (2011), caused controversy among members of the Conservative Party in the United Kingdom, which led to Theresa May, who was Home Secretary at the time, imposing a ban on Tyler from entering the country for three to five years. The ban was met with uproar, which was revisited when May became Prime Minister of the United Kingdom. Tyler and many of his fans believe the ban was racially motivated, with Tyler stating he felt he was being treated "like a terrorist", and that they did not like the fact that their children were idolizing a black man. The ban was lifted in May 2019.

In the album's title track, the first words Tyler says are cursing 2DOPEBOYZ, NahRight, and other blogs who Tyler viewed as snubbing him early in his career. After several attacks on different tracks in the following years, 2DOPEBOYZ founders Joel Zela and Meka Udoh addressed Tyler's comments in a February 17, 2011 post, claiming they weren't even aware of him as an artist until he started insulting them in interviews and on tracks. They said they never received music from Tyler or Odd Future and they would not work with him in the future, calling Tyler's outrage a marketing ploy.

Track listing 
All songs produced by Tyler, the Creator.

Notes
 "Blow" contains additional vocals from Syd tha Kyd
 On December 25, 2010, one year after the album's initial release, it was re-released with brandUn DeShay's verse on "Session" replaced by a verse from Mike G. However, in 2012, the album was re-uploaded to the official Odd Future website with both DeShay and Mike G credited on the song.
 "VCR" contains uncredited vocals from Earl Sweatshirt
 "Inglorious" contains uncredited vocals from Hodgy Beats

Sample credits
 "Seven" contains a sample from "The Sweetest Pain" performed by Dexter Wansel
 "Odd Toddlers" contains a sample from "Huit Octobre 1971" performed by Cortex
 "Jack and the Beanstalk" contains a vocal sample from "What More Can I Say" performed by Jay-Z

References 

2009 mixtape albums
Albums produced by Tyler, the Creator
Concept albums
Horrorcore albums
Tyler, the Creator albums
Self-released albums